Punctelia reddenda is a widely distributed species of foliose lichen in the family Parmeliaceae. It occurs in Africa, Europe, North America, and South America, where it grows on bark and on rock.

Taxonomy
It was first described scientifically in 1903 by Scottish cryptogam specialist James Stirton, as Parmelia reddenda. The type was collected by botanist James McAndrew near New Galloway in Scotland. In 1982, Hildur Krog transferred the taxon to Punctelia, a newly circumscribed genus, with 22 pseudocyphella-possessing species segregated from Parmelia.

Description
The lichen has an upper thallus surface that is grey, and covered with bright soredia. The lower surface of the thallus is black. Point-like, conspicuous (i.e., readily visible) pseudocyphellae are abundant on the surface. Also abundant are coarse, granular soredia. The medulla is white.

The cortex is K+ (yellow), indicating the presence of atranorin, while the medulla is negative for all lichen spot tests. A chemical analysis of Brazilian specimens using thin layer chromatography revealed the known compounds praesorediosic acid, protopraesorediosic acid, and protolichesterinic acid as well as an unidentified fatty acid.

The North American species Punctelia appalachensis is similar in appearance to P. reddenda, with a black thallus undersurface and negative medullary spot test reactions. However, it is distinguishable from P. reddenda because rather than soredia, it has abundant laminal and marginal  (growths of the upper cortex or thallus margin, usually with a constricted base, that fall away as propagules).

Habitat and distribution
Punctelia reddenda grows on bark, but has also been recorded growing on rock. An older (1974) source considered its European distribution to be more or less limited to coastal areas ranging from southern Sweden to Brittany. A 2008 survey of parmelioid lichens in Europe indicated its presence in Germany, Spain, France, Greece, Ireland, and Madeira, also noting that it was extinct in Sweden. In North America, its centre of distribution is the Appalachian Mountains. In South America, it occurs in Bolivia, Brazil, Chile, and Venezuela. It is also found in South Africa and Macaronesia.

References

reddenda
Lichen species
Lichens described in 1878
Lichens of Africa
Lichens of Europe
Lichens of North America
Lichens of South America
Lichens of Macaronesia
Taxa named by James Stirton